Orzeszków may refer to the following places in Poland:
Orzeszków, Lower Silesian Voivodeship (south-west Poland)
Orzeszków, Gmina Uniejów in Łódź Voivodeship (central Poland)
Orzeszków, Gmina Wartkowice in Łódź Voivodeship (central Poland)